Khaneqah (also Romanized as Khāneqāh) is a village in Qareh Naz Rural District, in the Central District of Maragheh County, East Azerbaijan Province, Iran. At the 2006 census, its population was 766, in 202 families.

References 

Towns and villages in Maragheh County